Cardin Le Bret (1558–1655) was a French jurist, known as the major supporter of the legal basis for the rule of Cardinal Richelieu in France.

On the key issue for absolutist conceptions of government, sovereignty, he stated that “sovereignty is no more divisible than the point in geometry”. His 1632 book on sovereignty has been called “the juridical handbook of the Richelieu regime”.

Notes

1558 births
1655 deaths
17th-century French lawyers
17th-century Latin-language writers
Latin-language writers from France
Ancien Régime office-holders